Maarten van Rossem (born 24 October 1943) is a Dutch historian, presenter and commentator. He specializes in the history and politics of the United States. As an expert on America, he is a frequent guest on television talk shows. His public career started when he was asked to comment on the 1984 vice presidential elections. He makes regular TV appearances and gives frequent public lectures.

Early life and education
Born in 1943 in Zeist, Van Rossem grew up in Wageningen (Netherlands). In his youth he became fascinated with the United States through a visit from his three American cousins. When they came to visit his parents, they each had their own photo camera with them. This led him to think all Americans were rich.

He attended the grammar school in Wageningen, graduating in the exact sciences. Initially he studied pharmacy at Utrecht University, because of his high marks for chemistry. Because he disliked the subject, he secretly switched to studying history. His family opposed this decision, stating that this would only lead to unemployment.

As a student in the 1960s, he said he was expected to be leftist and radical, but he chose not to go in that direction. He thought it would be very unlikely that there would be a revolutionary revolt against capitalism. Despite being brought up in a liberal environment, he joined the Labour Party in 1967.

He continued to be intrigued by the United States, collecting newspaper clippings on Martin Luther King Jr., President Kennedy and the Chicago riots.

After eight years he graduated cum laude. He wrote his senior thesis about the historiography of the Cold War with Hermann von der Dunk as his thesis advisor. Through his thesis he discovered the joy of writing: "You can say that at that point I became a historian".

His PhD thesis on the Partisan Review was also counseled by Von der Dunk, who allowed him to change the subject twice. It took him 12 years to finish it.

Historical career
In 1984, he published his best selling book The United States in the 20th century (Dutch title: De Verenigde Staten in de Twintigste Eeuw). Due to the acclaim and success of the book, he became a regular guest on various Dutch television channels to comment on American presidential elections. Since then he is often asked to speak at events concerning Dutch-American relations.

In 1996, he became a tenured professor occupying the endowed chair of modern history at the Utrecht University. This appointment allowed him to speak on a wider range of subjects. He was forced to retire from this position in 2008, in order to comply with the law as he had reached Dutch retirement age at the time. He derided this action, saying "Yesterday I had a normal working day; today my activities are seen as nothing more than occupational therapy for the elderly, focused on stimulating the brain, in order to prevent its precipitate decline after receiving the first state pension cheque", he said on his first day of retirement. He continues to give public lectures all around the country.

Television
Van Rossem is a regular guest in talkshows and news programs. He has had a history column in several programs. He has presented a number of programs himself, including (historical) documentaries and a quiz.

Van Rossem was a friend of Theo van Gogh. They made a 1997 talkshow together on local Amsterdam network AT5, and he played a role in one of his films.

Since 2012 Van Rossem has been the sole jury member on the Dutch version of De Slimste Mens quiz.

In the summer of 2012 he toured the United States in preparation of a documentary series on the 2012 presidential elections. 

Together with his siblings Vincent and Sis he has presented a program on Dutch, Belgian and German cities. Sis passed away in 2022. In 2019 he made a similar show with Vincent about cities in former East Germany.

Politics
During the 2012 Dutch general elections he was a lijstduwer for the Labour Party, which earned them 5,929 votes, ranking him the 16th most popular candidate.

Although having disavowed Labour because of its role in the second Rutte cabinet and having voted for D66 in 2017, he was lijstduwer in his home city of Utrecht for the 2022 Dutch municipal elections, claiming local was different than national.

Magazine
The first issue of his own magazine, the Maarten!, was published in the summer of 2008. Initially a one time addition to the Historic Newspaper (Dutch: Historisch Nieuwsblad), the glossy magazine has since grown into its own, circulating on a bimonthly basis. Even though the format parodies personality magazines like that of Linda de Mol, its content is serious, running editorials on current events and putting them against a historic background.

Podcast
Since 2020 Van Rossem has his own podcast, presented by Tom Jessen.

Personal life
He is married to Winnie van Rossem-Robijns, former editor of Margriet magazine.

References

External links
Official podcast website
 

1943 births
Living people
Dutch columnists
Dutch podcasters
Dutch political commentators
Academic staff of Utrecht University
Utrecht University alumni
Dutch republicans
20th-century Dutch historians
American studies scholars
Dutch political writers
People from Wageningen
21st-century Dutch historians